The 2019–20 Croatian First Football League (officially Hrvatski Telekom Prva liga for sponsorship reasons) was the 29th season of the Croatian First Football League, the national championship for men's association football teams in Croatia, since its establishment in 1992. The season started on 19 July 2019. It was temporarily postponed from 12 March to 5 June 2020 due to the COVID-19 pandemic.

The league was contested by ten teams.

Teams
On 23 April 2019, Croatian Football Federation announced that the first stage of licensing procedure for 2019–20 season was complete. For the 2019–20 Prva HNL, only nine clubs were issued a top level license: Dinamo Zagreb, Gorica, Hajduk Split, Inter Zaprešić, Istra 1961, Osijek, Rijeka, Slaven Belupo and Varaždin. All of these clubs except Varaždin, who were newly promoted to the Prva HNL as champions of the 2018–19 Croatian Second Football League, were also issued a license for participating in UEFA competitions. In the second stage of licensing, clubs that were not licensed in the first stage could appeal on the decision.

Stadia and locations

 1 Lokomotiva hosted their home matches at Stadion Kranjčevićeva. The stadium was originally the home ground of third-level side NK Zagreb.

Personnel and kits

Managerial changes

League table

Results
Each team played home-and-away against every other team in the league twice, for a total of 36 matches each played.

First round

Second round

Relegation play-offs
At the end of the season, Istra 1961 contested a two-legged relegation play-off tie against Orijent 1919, the third-placed team of the 2019–20 Croatian Second Football League, since runners-up Croatia Zmijavci failed to apply for a top level license.

First leg

Second leg

Istra 1961 won 3–1 on aggregate.

Statistics

Top goalscorers

Awards

Annual awards

References

External links
Official website 
Prva HNL at UEFA.com

2019-20
2019–20 in Croatian football
2019–20 in European association football leagues
Association football events postponed due to the COVID-19 pandemic